Richard Edward Bradley (born 17 August 1991) is a British racing driver. Bradley currently resides in Bangkok and races under a Singaporean racing license in Formula BMW Pacific and in the All-Japan Formula Three Championship. He currently competes in the European Le Mans Series with IDEC Sport.

Career

Karting
Bradley began his racing career in karting at the age of eleven and raced in various international championships, progressing to KF1 category in 2008, finishing eighth in the CIK-FIA European Championship.

Formula BMW Pacific
In 2010, Bradley graduated to single–seaters into the Formula BMW Pacific series in Asia, joining Eurasia Motorsport and racing under a Singaporean racing licence. He dominated from the opening round at Sepang and achieved seven wins on his way to both championship and Rookie titles.

Formula Three
In 2011, Bradley graduated to the All-Japan Formula Three Championship with Petronas Team TOM'S. He finished fifth with two podiums. During the season he also appeared in the Pau and Macau rounds of the FIA Formula 3 International Trophy.

For the next year Bradley continued in All-Japan Formula Three Championship with TOM'S. He scored six podiums and progressed to the fourth place in the championship standings. Also he contested in the Spa round of the FIA European Formula 3 Championship. Bradley also contested the end of year Formula Nippon test for Petronas Team TOM'S.

Super Formula
Bradley made his debut in the Super Formula in 2013 with KCMG, finishing 21st in the standings.

Racing record

Career summary

† – As Bradley was a guest driver, he was ineligible for points.

Complete Super Formula Results
(Races in bold indicate pole position)

Complete FIA World Endurance Championship results

† As Bradley was a guest driver, he was ineligible for points.

Complete 24 Hours of Le Mans results

Complete European Le Mans Series results

Complete IMSA SportsCar Championship results
(key)(Races in bold indicate pole position, Results are overall/class)

† Bradley did not complete sufficient laps in order to score points.

Complete Super GT results
(key) (Races in bold indicate pole position) (Races in italics indicate fastest lap)

References

External links
 
 

1991 births
Living people
British racing drivers
Formula BMW Pacific drivers
24 Hours of Le Mans drivers
Japanese Formula 3 Championship drivers
British Formula Three Championship drivers
FIA Formula 3 European Championship drivers
Super Formula drivers
FIA World Endurance Championship drivers
Asian Le Mans Series drivers
Carlin racing drivers
Manor Motorsport drivers
WeatherTech SportsCar Championship drivers
European Le Mans Series drivers
TOM'S drivers
KCMG drivers
Graff Racing drivers
Eurasia Motorsport drivers
Starworks Motorsport drivers
Le Mans Cup drivers